St Mary's Church, known also as St Mary's Pro-Cathedral or simply the Pro-Cathedral, the Chapel in Marlborough Street or the Pro, is a pro-cathedral and is the episcopal seat of the Roman Catholic Archbishop of Dublin and Primate of Ireland.

Status as "pro-cathedral" 

The city of Dublin possesses two cathedrals, but unusually, both belong to one church, the minority Church of Ireland, which had been the Established Church in Ireland until 1871. In contrast, the majority religion in Ireland, Roman Catholicism, has no cathedral in the Republic of Ireland's capital city and has not had one since the Protestant Reformation. As the official church, the Church of Ireland took control of most church property, including the Cathedral of the Holy Trinity (generally known as Christchurch) and St Patrick's Cathedral.

These two churches had long shared the role of cathedral of Dublin, controversially at first, then under an agreement of 1300, Pacis Compositio, which gave Christchurch formal precedence, including the right to enthrone the Archbishop and to hold his cross, mitre and ring after death, but with deceased Archbishops of Dublin to be buried alternately in each of the two cathedrals, unless they personally willed otherwise, and the two cathedrals to act as one, and "shared equally in their freedoms".

Even though Christchurch has been in the possession of the Church of Ireland for nearly five hundred years, it is still viewed by the Roman Catholic Church as the primary official Dublin cathedral, since it was so designated by the pope at the request of the then Archbishop of Dublin, St Laurence O'Toole in the 12th century. Unless the pope either formally revokes Christchurch's designation or grants cathedral status to another church, the main Roman Catholic church in Dublin will continue to be designated a "pro-cathedral" (meaning in effect acting cathedral), a title officially given to St Mary's Church in 1886, though it used that title unofficially since the 1820s.

History 
The Pro-Cathedral owes its origins to the Penal Laws which restricted Catholicism (and other non-Church of Ireland faiths) until the early nineteenth century. For centuries, Roman Catholics could not celebrate Mass or the sacraments in public and were subject to severe penalties (hence the word penal). While these laws ebbed and flowed in terms of the severity with which they were applied, Catholic churches if they were built at all, were built down narrow, difficult-to-find roadways. By the early nineteenth century, many of the Penal Laws had either been repealed or were no longer enforced; an unsuccessful attempt had already been made to grant Catholic Emancipation. As a result, Catholicism began to abandon its previous status as an "underground" religion.

In 1803, a committee formed by then Archbishop John Thomas Troy bought Lord Annesley's townhouse on the corner of Marlborough Street and Elephant Lane (now called Cathedral Street), within sight of the city's premier thoroughfare, Sackville Street (now O'Connell Street) as the location for the planned new pro-cathedral, pending the erection, when funds and the law allowed, of a full Roman Catholic cathedral. In 1814 a public competition had been announced by Archbishop Troy, inviting designs for the new church.

In June 1814 the demolition of the house took place. Constructed between 1815 and 1825, pro-cathedral combines a number of styles. The exterior is in Greek revival style, while the interior is more Renaissance style, based on the Church of Saint-Philippe du Roule of Paris. Archbishop of Dublin, Daniel Murray, celebrated the new pro-cathedral's completion on 14 November 1825, the feast of Dublin's patron saint, St Laurence O’Toole.

Though not a full cathedral, the new building became a symbol of the Irish nationalist spirit in the era following the ending of the Penal Laws. Daniel O'Connell, the leader of Irish nationalism and the first Roman Catholic MP elected to the British House of Commons, was present at a special thanksgiving High Mass in the Pro-Cathedral in 1829 following the granting of Catholic Emancipation, which among other things had allowed Catholics to be elected to parliament. In 1841, as the first Catholic Lord Mayor of Dublin in centuries, O'Connell formally celebrated his election by travelling in state to "the Pro" for High Mass. After he died in 1847, his remains were laid in state on a great catafalque in the Pro-Cathedral.

St Mary's baptism register contains quite a few entries for children born in the nearby Rotunda hospital; they were probably baptised quite quickly due to the feared infant mortality rates of the 19th century.

Plans for a full cathedral
The Pro-Cathedral was never intended to be other than a temporary acting cathedral, pending the availability of funds to build a full cathedral. Various locations for the new cathedral were discussed. W. T. Cosgrave, President of the Executive Council of the Irish Free State (prime minister) from 1922 to 1932 and a deeply religious Catholic, suggested that the burnt-out shell of the General Post Office, the location of the 1916 Rising, be turned into a cathedral, but the idea was not acted on, and the GPO was restored for use as a post office.

John Charles McQuaid, who served as Archbishop from the 1940s to the early 1970s, bought the gardens in the centre of Merrion Square and announced plans to erect a cathedral there, but to the relief of Dubliners, who preferred a garden in the centre of the city, his plans never came to pass and the gardens were eventually handed over by his successor to Dublin Corporation and opened to the public. While it is suggested periodically that the Church of Ireland, which has a relatively small membership, might hand over one of its cathedrals to the Catholic Church, no serious proposals have been made for such an arrangement. The Church of Ireland did offer one of the cathedrals to the Catholic church in the late 20th century but the offer was declined by the Catholic hierarchy apparently due to the projected cost of maintaining the building. (The Dean of St. Patrick's Cathedral (which serves as the "national cathedral" of the Church of Ireland - Christchurch is treated as the diocesan cathedral of Dublin) did suggest allowing Catholic Masses to be celebrated in St. Patrick's but the idea was dropped after opposition within the Church of Ireland.) Though theoretically, the possibility of erecting a new Catholic cathedral remains on the agenda, in reality, most of the funds collected for the building of a new cathedral have been spent erecting new churches in what was for a lengthy period a rapidly growing archdiocese.

State ceremony in the Pro-Cathedral

The Pro-Cathedral remains a focal point of religious and state ceremonial activity. Up until 1983, incoming presidents of Ireland traditionally attended, prior to their civil inauguration, a religious ceremony in either St Patrick's Cathedral (if they were members of the Church of Ireland) or the Pro-Cathedral (if they were Roman Catholic). Whereas up to 1973, those ceremonies were exclusively denominational, the ceremonies for the inaugurations of President Childers in 1973, President Ó Dálaigh in 1974 and President Hillery in 1976, were multidenominational, with representatives of the Roman Catholic, Church of Ireland, Presbyterian, Methodist and the Jewish faith taking part in the ceremony. (In 1973 it took place in St Patrick's, in 1974 and 1976 in the Pro-Cathedral.) In 1983 a multidenominational service was included as part of the civil inauguration in Dublin Castle.

The major faiths held religious ceremonies in their main cathedral or pro-cathedral to mark the beginning of the law term or a session of parliament, which would be attended by the President of Ireland, the Taoiseach, ministers, the opposition, parliamentarians and members of the Diplomatic Corps. State funerals of major figures including Michael Collins and former presidents Seán T. O'Kelly, Éamon de Valera, Patrick Hillery and Lord Mayor of Dublin Kathleen Clarke took place there. A painting of the funeral of Michael Collins hangs in Áras an Uachtaráin, the president's residence.

Pope Francis visited the Pro-Cathedral on 25 August 2018 during an apostolic visit to Ireland.

Layout
Internally, the Pro-Cathedral is dramatically different from the two main cathedrals of Dublin. Its mixture of Greek and Roman styles has proved controversial, being variously described as an artistic gem and an eyesore. Its main aisle leads up to an altar, behind which a stained glass window of the Blessed Virgin Mary (the Saint Mary of its name) is visible. For most of its existence, it possessed a massive Victorian altar and reredos by Peter Turnerelli, a Belfast-born sculptor of Italian parentage. In the late 1970s, this was removed, as part of a re-ordering to bring its sanctuary in line with changes that followed the introduction of the revision of the Mass. The reredos was completely removed, leaving just the tabernacle, though the front panel of the original altar was reinstated in the new altar, which was moved to the centre of a new paved area in an expanded sanctuary. The altar rails were also removed. The pulpit was moved as well, and is currently sitting unused in a corner of the building. A large contingent of Italian artisans were employed by the church, to decorate the interior of the cathedral.

The Pro-Cathedral caught fire in the early 1990s. Though the fire was extinguished before it caught hold of the building, considerable smoke damage was done to one corner of the building around the monument to Cardinal Cullen, perhaps the most famous of all the nineteenth-century Archbishops, and the first Archbishop of Dublin to be made a cardinal.

Organ of the Pro-Cathedral

The original organ in the Pro-Cathedral was built by the Dublin organ builder, John White, in the late 19th century, and the present instrument contains some of White's original pipework. The present facade of the organ dates from William Hill's rebuild of the organ around 1900. Subsequent work was carried out by Henry Willis & Co. in the 1930s, before J.W. Walker's major rebuild of 1971 under the administrator Monsignor John Moloney and the most recent refurbishment of the instrument, by the same firm which was completed in the autumn of 1995. The newly refurbished instrument was inaugurated in a gala concert given by Olivier Latry on 20 March 1996.

The swell of the organ is built into the back wall of the Church. The shutters of the swell are in line with the rest of the wall. The organ console itself was moved in a general redevelopment of the church in 1995. This was to facilitate the direction of the choir.

This organ has become regarded as one of the finest examples in Ireland of the late nineteenth-century grand Romantic organ, and has since its original installation featured prominently in the many great liturgical occasions which have graced the pro-cathedral church. More recently many of the great organ recitalists of our time have performed on it: Daniel Chorzempa, Xavier Darasse, Sir David Lumsden, Daniel Roth, Dame Gillian Weir, Arthur Wills, Olivier Latry, and others. The current Titular Organist of Saint Mary's Pro-Cathedral is Professor Gerard Gillen who has held this position since 1976. David Grealy was appointed Associate Organist in September 2017.

A chancel organ built by the Dublin organ builder, John White, is located on the epistle (right) side of the High Altar. It fell into disuse on the reordering of the sanctuary c.1980. Its mechanism and pipework are stored in the bowels of the Pro-Cathedral. In the early 2000s, a three-stop portable continuo organ was acquired, which provides accompaniment for sanctuary services such as Vespers/Evening Prayer, and is also used for continuo purposes in appropriate choral and orchestral repertoire.

Music of the Pro-Cathedral

Music has always been a central ministry in Saint Mary's Pro-Cathedral. The Church is noted for its Palestrina Choir, the resident choir of Saint Mary's Pro-Cathedral. It had its origins in a boys' choir formed in the 1890s by Vincent O'Brien, then a music teacher at St Mary's Place Christian Brothers School in Dublin. It was at a performance of Palestrina's Missa Papae Marcelli at St Teresa's Carmelite Church in Clarendon Street in 1898 that this choir came to the attention of Edward Martyn, their founding sponsor. Martyn wished to promote the music of Palestrina which was espoused by Pope Pius X as a standard to which liturgical music should aspire. The Palestrina Choir was constituted and installed in the Pro-Cathedral on 1 January 1903 with O'Brien as director.

In the century since its foundation, the Choir has had seven directors. Vincent O'Brien, director until 1946, was succeeded by his son, Oliver. In 1978, Fr Seán O hEarcaigh took over the baton from Oliver O'Brien. He was succeeded in 1982, by Ite O'Donovan and in 1996 by Comdt Joseph Ryan. Órla Barry was the director from the end of 1996 to 2001. The current director is Blánaid Murphy, who is widely recognised as one of Ireland's pre-eminent choral educators, particularly of children's voices. Over the years the Palestrina Choir has attracted singers of high renown. John McCormack was a member of the Choir from 1904 to 1905. Many recent members are now distinguished soloists, most notably Emmanuel Lawler, who began his singing career as a boy soprano in the Choir. In recent years, the Choir has travelled widely, singing at many cathedrals and venues throughout Ireland, Europe, and North America.

During the school term the Palestrina Choir sing at Sunday morning Solemn Latin Mass (Novus Ordo), Friday evening Vespers & Benediction of the Most Blessed Sacrament (5.15pm) and Mass (5.45pm).

A girls' choir was formed in 2009. The choir currently sing the 10am Mass on Sundays and the 5.45pm evening Mass on Tuesdays. Cantors and visiting choirs frequently assist with the musical liturgies in the cathedral.

Another permanent group is the Pro Nuova group, which sings contemporary liturgical music at the Sunday evening Mass.

Burials

John Thomas Troy, Archbishop of Dublin (1786–1823)
Daniel Murray, Archbishop of Dublin (1823–1852)
Edward Joseph Byrne, Archbishop of Dublin (1921–1940)
John Charles McQuaid, Archbishop of Dublin (1940–1972)
Dermot Ryan, Archbishop of Dublin (1972–1984)
Kevin McNamara, Archbishop of Dublin (1984–1987)
Desmond Connell, Archbishop of Dublin (1988–2004)

The interior

Notes

See also
 Roman Catholic Marian churches
 Diarmuid Martin - Archbishop of Dublin

References

External links

Saint Mary's Pro-Cathedral site
Palestrina Choir site

Roman Catholic cathedrals in the Republic of Ireland
Mary's Pro-Cathedral
Cathedrals in Dublin (city)
Roman Catholic churches in Dublin (city)
Roman Catholic churches completed in 1825
Greek Revival buildings
Greek Revival church buildings
Greek Revival architecture in Ireland
19th-century Roman Catholic church buildings in Ireland
Neoclassical church buildings in Ireland
19th-century churches in the Republic of Ireland